The male given name Zechariah is derived from the Hebrew זְכַרְיָה, meaning "The Lord has remembered."  It has been translated into English in many variant forms and spellings, including Zachariah, Zacharias and Zachary.

It was the name of various men in the Bible.

New Testament
Zechariah (New Testament figure), the father of John the Baptist.  In the King James version of the Bible his name was written Zacharias.  He is recognized as a saint in both the Eastern Orthodox Church and the Roman Catholic Church. See also: 
 Islamic view of Zechariah, and 
 Benedictus (Song of Zechariah), his song (canticle) of thanksgiving.

Hebrew Bible
Zechariah is the most common name in the Hebrew Bible.
Zechariah (Hebrew prophet), a prophet of the kingdom of Judah, spelled this way in KJV.
 His writings, the Book of Zechariah.
Zechariah of Israel (Zachariah in KJV), king of Israel (reigned for 6 months in c. 752 BCE), son of Jeroboam
Zechariah Ben Jehoiada, son of the High Priest in the times of Ahaziah and Joash. See also:
Tomb of Zechariah, a monument named after him in Jerusalem.

Minor characters
In addition to the characters named above, there are numerous minor characters in the Bible with the same name:
 A prophet, who had "understanding in the seeing of God," in the time of Uzziah, who was much indebted to him for his wise counsel: .
 One of the chiefs of the tribe of Reuben: .
 One of the porters of the tabernacle: .
 .
 A Levite who assisted at the bringing up of the ark from the house of Obed-edom: .
 A Kohathite Levite: .
 A Merarite Levite: .
 The father of Iddo: .
 One who assisted in teaching the law to the people in the time of Jehoshaphat: .
 A Levite of the sons of Asaph: .
 One of Jehoshaphat's sons: .
 The father of Abijah (queen), who was the mother of Hezekiah:  possibly the same as Isaiah's supporter Zechariah the son of Jeberechiah .
 One of the sons of Asaph: .
 One of the "rulers of the house of God": .
 .
 .
 .

See also
Zacchaeus

Set index articles on Hebrew Bible people
Books of Chronicles people

eo:Zeĥarja